Nassarius acutus, common name the sharp nassa, is a species of sea snail, a marine gastropod mollusc in the family Nassariidae, the Nassa mud snails or dog whelks.

Description
The length of the shell varies between 6 mm and 15 mm.

Distribution
This species occurs in the Northwest Atlantic Ocean off Virginia, USA; in the Gulf of Mexico and the Caribbean Sea.

References

 Cernohorsky W. O. (1984). Systematics of the family Nassariidae (Mollusca: Gastropoda). Bulletin of the Auckland Institute and Museum 14: 1–356
 Rosenberg, G., F. Moretzsohn, and E. F. García. 2009. Gastropoda (Mollusca) of the Gulf of Mexico, Pp. 579–699 in Felder, D.L. and D.K. Camp (eds.), Gulf of Mexico–Origins, Waters, and Biota. Biodiversity. Texas A&M Press, College Station, Texas. [details]

External links
 

Nassariidae
Gastropods described in 1822